David Vincent Segui, (born July 19, 1966) is an American former Major League Baseball first baseman.

Segui was born in Kansas City, Kansas, the son of former Major League baseball pitcher Diego Seguí. He played collegiate baseball for Louisiana Tech and Kansas City Kansas Community College. During a 15-year baseball career, Segui played with the Baltimore Orioles, New York Mets, Montreal Expos, Seattle Mariners, Toronto Blue Jays, Texas Rangers and Cleveland Indians.

In 1456 games over 15 seasons, Segui posted a .291 batting average (1412-for-4847) with 683 runs, 284 doubles, 139 home runs, 684 RBI, 524 bases on balls, .359 on-base percentage and .443 slugging percentage. He recorded a .995 fielding percentage primarily as a first baseman, but also played 100 games at left and right field.

Segui was identified by Jason Grimsley as one of the players who had taken human growth hormone during his major league career (he was one of the players whose name was redacted on Grimsley's document). Unlike others, however, Segui had a doctor's prescription for HGH to counter a deficiency he had been diagnosed with, and had previously admitted to using them.

Segui has also admitted to using anabolic steroids during his career with the Mets, obtaining them from former clubhouse attendant Kirk Radomski. Segui never had any spikes in his performances or home runs, but says he knows about other ballplayers' usage. He was included in the Mitchell Report, which named people who were found using either HGH, steroids, or some other type of PEDs.

See also
 List of second-generation Major League Baseball players
 List of Major League Baseball players named in the Mitchell Report
 List of Cuban Americans

References

External links

1966 births
Living people
American expatriate baseball players in Canada
American sportspeople in doping cases
American sportspeople of Cuban descent
Baltimore Orioles players
Baseball players from Kansas
Bowie Baysox players
Cleveland Indians players
Frederick Keys players
Hagerstown Suns players
Kansas City T-Bones players
Louisiana Tech Bulldogs baseball players
Major League Baseball first basemen
Montreal Expos players
New York Mets players
Rochester Red Wings players
Seattle Mariners players
Sportspeople from Kansas City, Kansas
Texas Rangers players
Toronto Blue Jays players
KCKCC Blue Devils baseball players